Bromobutane (molecular formula: C4H9Br, molar mass: 137.02 g/mol) may refer to either of two chemical compounds:

1-Bromobutane (n-butyl bromide)
2-Bromobutane (sec-butyl bromide or methylethylbromomethane)